Hans Hermann Matthöfer (25 September 1925 – 14 November 2009) was a German politician of the Social Democratic Party (SPD).

Between 1974 and 1978 Matthöfer served as secretary of research and technology. In 1978 he took over as secretary of finance and in 1982 he left that post and served briefly as secretary of telecommunication. After his party lost power in 1982 he gave up all positions in the German government.

Biography 
Born in Bochum in 1925, Matthöfer served an apprenticeship in commercial science
before being drafted as a soldier in the Second World War between 1943 and 1945. In 1946 he passed his examination as an interpreter for the English language. Three years later Matthöfer studied successfully economics and social science at the University of Frankfurt/Main as well as Madison, Wisconsin.  In 1953 he received his bachelor of economics.

After his return to Germany Matthöfer began work in the department of economics for the workers union IG Metall, followed by 4 years at the Organisation for European Economic Co-operation in Washington, D.C. and Paris. After his return to Germany he again worked for the IG Metall and developed a program for the education in companies as well as tariff policy. Between 1987 and 1997 he was president of the BGAG, an investment company owned by the workers union.

Matthöfer joined the Social Democratic party of Germany in 1950. Between 1973 and 1984 he belonged to the Social Democratic party's executive board, followed by a position as its treasurer between 1985 and 1987.

Literature 
 Werner Abelshauser: Nach dem Wirtschaftswunder. Der Gewerkschafter, Politiker und Unternehmer Hans Matthöfer. Dietz, Bonn 2009, ISBN 978-3-8012-4171-1.
 Helmut Schmidt; Walter Hesselbach (Hrsg.): Kämpfer ohne Pathos: Festschrift für Hans Matthöfer. Bonn 1985.

References

External links 

1925 births
2009 deaths
People from Bochum
Finance ministers of Germany
Members of the Bundestag for Hesse
Members of the Bundestag 1983–1987
Members of the Bundestag 1980–1983
Members of the Bundestag 1976–1980
Members of the Bundestag 1972–1976
Members of the Bundestag 1969–1972
Members of the Bundestag 1965–1969
Members of the Bundestag 1961–1965
Sozialistischer Deutscher Studentenbund members
Grand Crosses 1st class of the Order of Merit of the Federal Republic of Germany
Members of the Bundestag for the Social Democratic Party of Germany